José Luiz Vieira (born 22 August 1959) is a Brazilian former handball player. He competed in the men's tournament at the 1992 Summer Olympics.

References

External links
 

1959 births
Living people
Brazilian male handball players
Olympic handball players of Brazil
Handball players at the 1992 Summer Olympics
People from Maringá
Sportspeople from Paraná (state)
Pan American Games bronze medalists for Brazil
Pan American Games medalists in handball
Medalists at the 1987 Pan American Games
Pan American Games silver medalists for Brazil
Medalists at the 1991 Pan American Games
20th-century Brazilian people